Diana Serra Cary (born Peggy-Jean Montgomery; October 29, 1918 – February 24, 2020), known as Baby Peggy, was an American child film actress, vaudevillian, author and silent film historian. She was the last living person with a substantial career in silent films.

Baby Peggy was one of the three major American child stars of the Hollywood silent film era along with Jackie Coogan and Baby Marie. Between 1921 and 1924, she made over 150 short films for the Century Film Corporation. In 1922, she received over 1.2 million fan letters and by 1924, she had been dubbed The Million Dollar Baby for her $1.5 million annual salary ($ million in ). Despite her childhood fame and wealth, her parents mismanaged her finances and by the time she came of age she found herself poor and working as an extra by the 1930s.

Having an interest in both writing and history since her youth, Montgomery found a second career as an author and silent film historian in her later years under the name Diana Serra Cary. She was the author of several books including her historical novel The Drowning of the Moon. She was also an advocate for child actors' rights.

Early life
She was born on October 29, 1918, in San Diego, California as Peggy-Jean Montgomery, the second daughter of Marian (née Baxter) and Jack Montgomery. While some sources incorrectly give her birth name as Margaret, Cary herself, in her autobiography, notes that she was indeed born as Peggy-Jean. She further explained the Roman Catholic nuns at her birth hospital recommended the name Margaret as Peggy was a pagan name. Her parents rejected the suggestion. Her elder sister, legally named Jack-Louise (1916–2005), was called Louise or occasionally Jackie.

Career

Acting
Baby Peggy was "discovered" at the age of 19 months, when she visited Century Studios on Sunset Boulevard in Hollywood with her mother and a film-extra friend. Her father, Jack, a former cowboy and park ranger, had done work as a stuntman and stand-in for Tom Mix in a number of his cowboy films. Impressed by Peggy's well-behaved demeanor and willingness to follow directions from her father, director Fred Fishback hired her to appear in a series of short films with Century's canine star Brownie the Wonder Dog. The first film, Playmates in 1921, was a success, and Peggy was signed to a long-term contract with Century.

Between 1921 and 1924, Peggy made close to 150 short comedy films for Century. Her films often spoofed full-length motion pictures, social issues and stars of the era; in one, Peg O' The Movies, she satirized both Rudolph Valentino and Pola Negri. She also appeared in film adaptations of novels and fairy tales, such as Hansel and Gretel and Jack and the Beanstalk, contemporary comedies, and a few full-length motion pictures.

In 1923, Peggy began working for Universal Studios, appearing in full-length dramatic films. Among her works from this era were The Darling of New York, directed by King Baggot, and the first screen adaptation of Captain January. In line with her status as a star, Peggy's Universal films were produced and marketed as "Universal Jewels", the studio's most prestigious and most expensive classification. During this time, she also starred in Helen's Babies, opposite Clara Bow.

The success of the Baby Peggy films brought her into prominence. When she was not filming, she embarked on extensive "In-Person" personal appearance tours across the country to promote her films. She was also featured in several short skits on major stages in Los Angeles and New York City, including Grauman's Million Dollar Theatre and the Hippodrome. Her likeness appeared on magazine covers and was used in advertisements for various businesses and charitable campaigns. She was also named the Official Mascot of the 1924 Democratic Convention in New York City, and stood onstage waving a United States flag next to Franklin Delano Roosevelt.

By the age of 5, she had her own line of various endorsed items, including dolls in her likeness, sheet music, jewelry, and even milk.

As a child, Frances Gumm (later Judy Garland) owned at least one Baby Peggy doll. Cary would later befriend Garland, and wrote in her autobiography that she believed Garland's mother had pursued fame for her children based on Baby Peggy's success.

While under contract with Century and Universal, Peggy commanded an impressive salary. By 1923, she was signed to a $1.5 million a year contract at Universal ($ million in ); on her vaudeville tours she made $300 per day. Her parents handled all of the finances and money was spent on expensive cars, homes, and clothing. Nothing was set aside for the welfare or education of Peggy or her sister. Peggy herself was paid one nickel for every vaudeville performance. Through reckless spending and corrupt business partners of her father, her entire fortune was gone before she hit puberty. When fellow child star Jackie Coogan sued his parents in 1938, Peggy's parents asked her if she was going to do the same. Believing it would do no good, Peggy did not pursue legal action. Coogan's case, and cases like Baby Peggy's, eventually inspired the Coogan Act to protect child actors' earnings.

Working conditions
Peggy's working conditions, as described in later interviews and her autobiography, were harsh. As a toddler she worked eight hours a day, six days a week. She was generally required to perform her own stunts, which included being held underwater in the ocean until she fainted (Sea Shore Shapes), escaping alone from a burning room (The Darling of New York), and riding underneath a train car (Miles of Smiles). While at Century she also witnessed several instances of animal cruelty and saw a trainer crushed to death by an elephant.

Schooling for both Peggy and her sister, Louise, was sporadic at best. Neither attended school until the end of the vaudeville era; for their secondary education, they worked to pay for their tuition at Lawlor Professional School, which offered flexible schedules and allowed them to continue performing in films.

Baby Peggy’s career was controlled by her father, who accompanied her to the studio every day and made every decision about her contracts. Mr. Montgomery often claimed that Peggy's success was based not on her own talent, but on her ability to follow orders unquestioningly.

Film career fade out and stage work
Baby Peggy's film career abruptly ended in 1925 when her father had a falling out with producer Sol Lesser over her salary and canceled her contract. She found herself essentially blacklisted due to actions of her father with his studio boss, and was able to land only one more part in silent films, a minor role in the 1926 picture April Fool.

From 1925 to 1929, Peggy had a successful career as a vaudeville performer. Although her routine, which included a comedy sketch, singing and a dramatic monologue, was initially met with skepticism, it soon became a popular and respected act. Although she was prohibited from "playing the Palace" because of her young age, she appeared onstage there as a special guest. Peggy and her family toured the United States and Canada, performing in major venues, until the family tired of touring.

While on the vaudeville circuit, Peggy was frequently ill with tonsillitis and other ailments; however, she continued working. In What Ever Happened to Baby Peggy?, she wrote, "On several occasions I went onstage so yellow-dog sick they had to put buckets in the wings: I threw up in one before I made my entrance, and in the second when I exited, before changing and going back out for my encore." Her mother feared for her health, another reason for leaving the rough life of touring.

Peggy's parents continued to spend excessively after she had been pushed out of films, wasting on unnecessary luxuries much of the  she had made. Peggy's father planned to buy a ranch and convert it into a high-end getaway. However, the stock market crash of 1929 put an immediate halt to the plans. The Montgomerys had to sell their Beverly Hills home and, having made a $75,000 deposit on the land and existing property, moved to rural Wyoming where they lived near the Jelm Mountains. Peggy found the change in pace refreshing and hoped her stage days were over. However, the family struggled to make a living, and, as a last-ditch effort, returned to Hollywood in the early 1930s, much to the teenaged Peggy's chagrin. She stated in a 2012 interview that she was paid three dollars a day, and many of the other extras were other silent actor stars that she grew up with, and collectively they considered the work to be like that of "galley slaves".

Peggy posed for publicity photos with Douglas Fairbanks Sr., and signed with a new manager. Hopes of a comeback were mostly dashed by false rumors of a bad screen test that had never taken place. The family resorted to using food coupons from the Motion Picture Relief Fund. The Los Angeles School Board asserted that Peggy had to go to school, and was first enrolled at Lawlor Professional School, a school with flexible hours for child actors, and was classmates with Mickey Rooney and Judy Garland. She later attended Fairfax High School while the entire family was forced to take extra work. She loathed screen work and retired soon after appearing in Having Wonderful Time in 1938.

In the spring of 1940, Peggy's career had reached such a low, journalist Walter Winchell in his column On Broadway reported Peggy and her husband Gordon Ayres were now living in a small furnished room in New York City, with only doughnuts to eat. Gordon Ayres was working as a bartender while Peggy was looking for a screen job.

Post-acting years

Peggy married Gordon Ayres in 1938 and a few years later adopted the name Diana Ayres in an effort to distance herself from the Baby Peggy image. Working at the time as a writer for radio shows, she found that people who figured out her identity were more interested in her Baby Peggy persona than in her writing abilities. She later changed her name to Diana Serra Cary explaining, "After my divorce [from Gordon Ayres] and when I became a Catholic I took Serra as my confirmation name. When I married Bob [her second husband] I became Mrs. Cary."

Following acting, she had worked as a switchboard operator, a bookstore clerk, and a gift shop manager before she got into freelance writing.

Eventually, after years of emotional struggle and open derision from Hollywood insiders and the media, Cary made peace with her Baby Peggy past. She had successful careers as a publisher, historian and author on Hollywood subjects, writing, among other works, an autobiography of her life as a child star, What Ever Happened to Baby Peggy: The Autobiography of Hollywood's Pioneer Child Star, and a biography of her contemporary and rival named Jackie Coogan: The World's Boy King: A Biography of Hollywood's Legendary Child Star.

As an adult, Cary worked on numerous books about the early film industry, Hollywood cowboys and harsh working conditions for child stars in Hollywood. At the end of her own autobiography, she recounts the fates of numerous child stars, including Judy Garland and Shirley Temple. She also advocated for reforms in child performer protection laws as a member of the organization "A Minor Consideration".

Cary appeared in numerous television documentaries and interviews about her work, and made guest appearances at silent film festivals. At the age of 99, Cary self-published her first novel, The Drowning of the Moon.

Personal life and death
At the age of seventeen, trying to escape the film industry and her parents' plans for her life, Cary ran away from home and rented an apartment with her sister Louise. She married actor Gordon Ayres, whom she met on the set of Ah, Wilderness!, in 1938. They divorced in 1948. In 1954, she married artist Robert "Bob" Cary (sometimes listed as Bob Carey). They had one son, Mark. They remained married until Cary's death in 2001. She lived in Gustine, California, near Modesto, for many years. 
Peggy died at her home in Gustine on February 24, 2020, at age 101.

Honors
On November 8, 2008, ten days after her 90th birthday, Cary was honored at the Edison Theatre in Niles, California, with a screening of two of her feature films, Helen's Babies and Captain January.

Diana Serra Cary's handprints and signature are preserved in cement outside the Vista Theater in East Hollywood. Baby Peggy's film "Tips" was the first film shown at the cinema when it opened in 1923.

Since 2012, there have been attempts to get Cary a star on the Hollywood Walk of Fame through a crowdfunding campaign, but as of 2021 it has not yet succeeded. On December 3, 2012, Turner Classic Movies first presented the 2011 documentary Baby Peggy: The Elephant in the Room, and has since reaired on various occasions, such as alongside the first broadcast of the Library of Congress-restored version of The Family Secret on October 25, 2015, to mark Cary's 97th birthday.

In 2018, Cary was honored at the 54th Annual Cinecon Classic Film Festival with the Cinecon Legacy Award accompanied by a screening of the restored feature, Helen's Babies with a world premiere score by composer Scott Lasky. It was performed by the Famous Players Orchestra at Grauman's Egyptian Theater. Too ill to attend, Lasky flew to Gustine, California and recorded an interview with Cary where she talked about making the film and of its co-stars, Clara Bow and Edward Everett Horton.  It was screened prior to the feature film.

Films

The vast majority of Cary's Baby Peggy films have not survived and records related to their production have been lost as well. Century Studios burned down in 1926. In addition, another older actress named Peggy Montgomery (1904–1989) was active in Hollywood Western films between 1924 and 1929; her credits are occasionally confused with those of Baby Peggy. Filmographies at major websites are incomplete, and sometimes incorrect, because of these factors.

A handful of Baby Peggy shorts, including Playmates, Miles of Smiles and Sweetie, have been discovered and preserved in film archives around the world, including the Museum of Modern Art in New York City. The full-length films The Family Secret, April Fool, Captain January and Helen's Babies have also survived, are currently in the public domain, and have been restored and made available for sale by several independent film dealers. A full copy of The Law Forbids is also rumored to exist, but it has not surfaced publicly. In addition, fragments of some works, including The Law Forbids, The Darling of New York and Little Red Riding Hood have surfaced and been restored.

In 2016, it was announced that her lost 1924 film Our Pet had been re-discovered in Japan.

Filmography

As documented by research of the Museum of Modern Art.

See also 

 List of centenarians (actors, filmmakers, and entertainers)

References

Bibliography
 Baby Peggy's Own Story Book, Diana Serra Cary, Frederick A. Stokes, 1924
 What Ever Happened to Baby Peggy: The Autobiography of Hollywood's Pioneer Child Star, Diana Serra Cary, St. Martins Press, 1996,
 The Hollywood Posse: The Story of a Gallant Band of Horsemen Who Made Movie History, Diana Serra Cary, University of Oklahoma Press, 1996,
 Hollywood's Children: An Inside Account of the Child Star Era, Diana Serra Cary, Southern Methodist University Press, 1997,
 Jackie Coogan: The World's Boy King: A Biography of Hollywood's Legendary Child Star, Diana Serra Cary, Scarecrow Press, 2003,
 The Shirley Temple Story, Lester David, Putnam Pub Group, 1983,
 Silent Stars Speak: Interviews with Twelve Cinema Pioneers, Tony Villecco, 2001,
 "At 93, a Party Girl Is Silent No More", photographs, interview and article by Bruce Bennett, in the U.S. edition of The Wall Street Journal, September 5, 2012, page A19.
 "The Last Silent Star Standing: An Oral History of 1920s Film With Diana Serra Cary," photographs, interview and article by Jeffrey Crouse, Film International, Vol. 11, No. 2, 2013, pages 6–24.

External links

 
 
Baby Peggy: The Elephant in the Room
An interview with Baby Peggy
Baby Peggy at Virtual History
Interview with Diana Serra Cary – The Spectrum, June, 2016.

1918 births
2020 deaths
20th-century American actresses
Actresses from San Diego
American biographers
American book publishers (people)
American centenarians
American child actresses
American film actresses
American memoirists
American silent film actresses
Catholics from California
Converts to Roman Catholicism
Fairfax High School (Los Angeles) alumni
Vaudeville performers
American women biographers
American women memoirists
Writers from San Diego
Women centenarians
21st-century American women